Innocent Kamwa is a Canadian electrical engineer who is a professor and Tier 1 Canada Research Chair in Decentralised Sustainable Electricity Grids for Smart Communities at Université Laval. He was elected a Fellow of the National Academy of Engineering in 2022.

Early life and education 
Kamwa studied applied science at the Université Laval, where he studied electronic engineering. He stayed at Laval for his doctoral research, where he modelled synchronous machines.

Research and career 
Kamwa joined the Hydro-Québec Smart Grid Innovation program, where he spent 25 years. He has worked on improving power system stability, developing intelligent algorithms for application in industry. He developed Hydro-Quebec's first Multiband Power System Stabiliser. In 2021, he was made a Tier 1 Canada Research Chair, and became a full professor at the Université Laval.

Awards and honours 
 Elected Fellow of the Canadian Academy of Engineering 
 2005 Elected Fellow of the Institute of Electrical and Electronics Engineers (IEEE)
 2019 IEEE Charles Proteus Steinmetz Award
 2019 IEEE Charles Concordia Award
 2022 Elected Fellow of the National Academy of Engineering

Selected publications

References 

Year of birth missing (living people)
Living people
Université Laval alumni
Canadian electrical engineers
21st-century Canadian engineers
Academic staff of Université Laval
Members of the United States National Academy of Engineering
Fellow Members of the IEEE
Fellows of the Canadian Academy of Engineering